Kamal Khalil is an Egyptian engineer and labour activist. He is a leading member of the Revolutionary Socialists, a representative of the Workers Democratic Party and the founder and director of the Center for Socialist Studies in Cairo. He is a critic of the social democrats, youth parties and the Muslim Brotherhood in the post-Mubarak Egypt. He advocates more workers' unity, particularly in regions such as El-Mahalla El-Kubra, which has in the past been a center of industrial struggle by textile workers. Khalil has said Egypt's workers must create independent trade unions and a political party to represent them: "No party will represent the workers other than the workers' party itself." Prior to the Egyptian Revolution of 2011, Khalil had been arrested many times. In 2003, he was arrested by the State Security Investigations Service (SSI) and placed in solitary confinement for his role in the anti-war movement, causing the Stop the War Coalition in Britain to demonstrate outside the Egyptian Embassy in London.

See also
 Revolutionary Socialists
 Workers Democratic Party
 Center for Socialist Studies

References

Living people
Egyptian democracy activists
Egyptian dissidents
Egyptian human rights activists
Egyptian revolutionaries
Egyptian Trotskyists
People of the Egyptian revolution of 2011
Revolutionary Socialists (Egypt)
Egyptian trade unionists
Year of birth missing (living people)